My Son Johnny is a 1991 American fact-based made-for-television drama film starring Michele Lee, Rick Schroder and Corin Nemec, directed by Peter Levin. It was originally broadcast on CBS as The CBS Sunday Movie on November 10, 1991.

Plot
Johnny Cortino is a 21-year-old hoodlum returning home to Baltimore after a stint in California; exactly why he's back is not clear and, when confronted for details, Johnny is able to fast-talk his way out of every corner he is backed in to. Yet, it is clear that his widowed mother Marianne is glad to see her son that - despite his problems - is still the apple of her eye. And it is equally clear that 17-year-old Anthony is terrified that his older brother is back in the house.

As soon as Johnny returns home, the war of intimidation quickly resumes, and Anthony finally reaches the breaking-point when, after a particularly nasty beating by Johnny, he pulls a gun on his brother and shoots him to death. With Anthony facing a life sentence for murder, Marianne has one chance of saving him: following years of denial about Johnny's bullying, she is torn between upholding his memory and defending her younger offspring, but also realizes she must confront the terrible truth about Johnny and, before the eyes of the world, admit there has been a lifetime of sibling violence. In the end, the verdict is read and Anthony is found not guilty.

Cast
Michele Lee as Marianne Cortino
Ricky Schroder as Johnny Cortino
Corin Nemec as Anthony Cortino
Mariangela Pino as Rhoda Cortino
Stephen Dimopoulos as Louie Cortino
Ken Pogue as Judge Burke
Joy Coghill as Anna Cortino
Gwynyth Walsh as Janet David
Rip Torn as Brian Stansbury

References

External links
 

1991 television films
1991 films
1991 drama films
CBS network films
Films set in Baltimore
Films about domestic violence
Films about dysfunctional families
Films about bullying
Films about brothers
Drama films based on actual events
American drama television films
Films directed by Peter Levin
1990s American films
1990s English-language films